The Gold Smelters, also known as the Barbican Frieze, Bryer's Frieze, Gold Refiners, or abridged as Gold Smelters, is an outdoor frieze relief by J. Daymond, installed along Aldersgate Street in London, United Kingdom. It was saved from a building demolished in the 1960s and re-erected in its present location by the Corporation of London in 1975.

Description
The medium relief depicts twelve figures engaged in gold refining trade, plus a cat. The relief is part of a large concrete block mounted on a brick plinth. A nearby plaque reads, .

References

External links
 

Cats in art
Outdoor sculptures in London
Sculptures of men in the United Kingdom
City of London